Carmenta ogalala is a moth of the family Sesiidae. It was described by Engelhardt in 1946. It is known from Colorado.

References

External links
mothphotographersgroup

Sesiidae
Moths described in 1946